The Adventures of Timmy the Tooth is an American direct-to-video musical puppet series produced by Bomp Productions and MCA/Universal Home Video. The episodes were released from 1994 to 1996.

Production
The series was created by puppeteers James Murray, Dina Fraboni and Kevin Carlson. Phil Baron co-wrote all episodes with Carlson and Murray. The characters were designed by Drew Massey and Bob Fappiano, with puppets built by Bob Fappiano and additional puppets and marionettes by Christine Papelexis. Composed by Joyce Imbesi, the songs were written by Imbesi and Willow Wray with some by Craig Thomas, Richard Friedman, Tina Mitchell and Jonathan Raines, Murray, Carlson and Baron.

Plot
This show was about the adventures of a talking tooth named Timmy and all his friends of Flossmore Valley as they go on adventures using their imaginations, which would usually have Timmy thwarting bad guys like the Cavity Goon and Miss Sweety or the Gingivitis Gang.

Cast
 Greg Ballora – Emmett, Lifeguard (episode 4), King Louie (episode 7), Thirstin the Cloud (episodes 4 and 9), Clem (episodes 9 and 10)
 Phil Baron – Leo, Mr. Wisdom, Walter Crunelemuffin (episode 1), Sunny the Sun (episode 4), Raz the Beatnik (episode 5), Gus (episode 10)
 Cheryl Blaylock – Bubbles Gum
 Kevin Carlson – Timmy the Tooth, Nolan, Windslow the Cloud (episodes 4 and 9)
 Michael Earl – Miss Flossy, Mumfred the Mummy (episode 6), Mr. Bonkers (episode 8), Bunky (episodes 9 and 10)
 Dina Fraboni – Irene the Flower, Dee
 Bruce Lanoil – Sidney Cyclops, Miss Sweety, Kay, Big Dan (episode 4), Mumfred's Dad (episode 6)
 Todd Mattox – Brushbrush, Leggs O'Many
 James Murray – Cavity Goon, Darol, Bob (episode 4), Skunk the Beatnik (episode 5)
 Christine Papalexis – Annette Bruner Prower, Nicki the Flower, Mumfred's Mom (episode 6)
 Allan Trautman – Johnny Paste, Gil the Grouper, Sherry the Fairy, Sunny the Sun, Vinnie da Guy (episode 3), Rodney the Spider (episode 6)

Characters
Main
 Timmy the Tooth (performed by Kevin Carlson) is the main protagonist. He is an adventurous tooth that lives with his best friend Brushbrush and is prone to burst into song.
 Brushbrush (performed by Todd Mattox) – Timmy's pet toothbrush who behaves like a dog. He whispers or bristles his words, although Timmy is the only one who can understand him unlike the other characters.
 Bubbles Gum (performed by Cheryl Blaylock) is Timmy's blue-skinned friend is always ready to help Timmy as well as go on an adventure. She tends to take lead of things, and usually calls Timmy by his full name.
 Miss Flossy (performed by Michael Earl) is a cowgirl of sorts who is constantly having a good time. Despite her name, she has a blob-like appearance.
 Waxie is Flossie's unicorn-type hobby horse.
 Sidney Cyclops (performed by Bruce Lanoil) is a one-eyed male monster and Timmy's friend who wants to become the greatest paper boy in the world. He is much younger than Timmy and looks up to him as his best friend.
 Annette Bruner Prower (performed by Christine Papelexis) is Timmy's yellow-skinned friend is exactly a ditz, but always there for her friends. Her other name is also Full of Jello, her general middle and last names are Bruner and Prower.
 Johnny Paste (performed by Allan Trautman) is a large muscular tube of toothpaste who is another one of Timmy's friends. He is well-meaning, but not all that bright.
 Mr. Wisdom (performed by Phil Baron) is an old wisdom tooth who lives up on Wisdom Mountain. He gives advice to Timmy and his friends when they need it.

Supporting
 Sherry (performed by Allan Trautman) is an elderly female fairy who is the local fortune teller.
 Gil (performed by Allan Trautman) is a grinning green grouper.
 Sunny (performed by Allan Trautman in most episodes, Phil Baron in "Malibu Timmy") is a hot and smiling sun that wears sunglasses.
 Leggs O'Many (performed by Todd Mattox) is a cool piano-playing octopus.
 Nicki and Irene (performed by Christine Papelexis and Dina Fraboni) are the two flowers in Timmy's front yard. They both love the rain and love to be watered.
 Emmett (performed by Greg Ballora) is Timmy's mailbox.
 Thirstin and Windslow (performed by Greg Ballora and Kevin Carlson) are two clouds.
 Clem (performed by Greg Ballora) – 
 Bunky (performed by Michael Earl) –

Villains
 The Cavity Goon (performed by James Murray) is the main antagonist of the series. The Cavity Goon (otherwise known as Goonius Nemesis III) is a disgusting sight...a green creature covered with spots and a mouth full of decayed sharp teeth. He wears clothes that appear to be made of ripped-up leaves and is constantly bothering Timmy and his friends. In the episode "Lost My Brush", the Cavity Goon even tried to kidnap Timmy by using the kidnapped Brushbrush to lure him in an attempt to turn him over to the Tooth Fairy for money.
 Miss Sweety (performed by Bruce Lanoil) is the Cavity Goon's sidekick. She is an enormous peppermint candy on a stick who always joins her boss on his evil plots.
 The Gingivitis Gang are a group of ambiguous creatures and the secondary antagonists. Although their hobbies include looking for trouble and harassing Timmy and his friends, they are not inherently evil and even occasionally assist Timmy.
 Leo (performed by Phil Baron) is the red-horned, lavender-haired, blue-skinned leader of the Gingivitis Gang.
 Kay (performed by Bruce Lanoil) is the female bird-like member of the Gingivitis Gang with orange skin and red hair.
 Dee (performed by Dina Fraboni) is the blonde-haired, pinkish orange-skinned, female insect-like member of the Gingivitis Gang.
 Darol (performed by James Murray) is the blue-haired, green-skinned member of the Gingivitis Gang.
 Nolan (performed by Kevin Carlson) is the rose-colored, yellow-haired, hook-nosed, and green-horned member of the Gingivitis Gang.

Episodes

Home media
The Adventures of Timmy the Tooth aired in syndication from January 16 to 31, 1995 and later on Nickelodeon as part of the Nick Jr. block from November 6, 1995 to May 17, 1996. It was announced to be on Peacock upon launch.

Popular culture
 Some of the characters have appeared in the Puppet Greetings cards.
 The puppet for Annette Bruner Prower was used as Whatnot.
 The puppet for Bubbles Gum was used as Brenda.
 The puppet for Sidney Cyclops was used as Eyegore.
 The puppet for Sunny the Sun was used as Sunny for the "Sunny and Chair" segments.
 The orange puppet which was used for different characters for this show like King Louie was used as Pho Dude.
 The puppet for Sherry the Fairy was later used as Madame Bullsheetza.	
 The puppet for Gil the Grouper was later used as Elfish Perchley, Gill O'Reilly, and others.
 The puppet for Leggs O'Many was later used as a mother octopus in a "Mother's Day" card greeting.
 A short excerpt from the show was shown in the film American Pie 2.
 Some of the characters from this show have appeared in FOX's Greg the Bunny as different characters.
 Cavity Goon was used as Cranky the Camera Man.
 The Gingivitis Gang were used for background appearances like background crew members.
 In a final-season episode of The Fresh Prince of Bel Air ("Eye, Tooth"), Will, while on the effects of laughing gas, puts a tooth on his head and calls himself "Timmy the Tooth".
 Timmy appeared in three videos uploaded by Carlson on his YouTube channel in 2020 in where Timmy is with his therapist PuppetJi on Zoom during the quarantine caused by the COVID-19 pandemic. Timmy then appeared in a fourth video uploaded in 2021.

References

External links
 

1994 American television series debuts
1994 American television series endings
1990s American children's television series
1990s American music television series
American children's adventure television series
American children's fantasy television series
American children's musical television series
American television shows featuring puppetry
Direct-to-video television series
English-language television shows
Television series by Universal Television
Nick Jr. original programming